Arthur Farrell (1 November 1920 – 20 September 2000) was a professional footballer who played as a defender for Bradford Park Avenue, Barnsley and Scarborough.

He later moved to the Isle of Wight, where he died aged 79 after suffering from Parkinson's disease.

Father of Robert, Geoff and Tony. Grandfather of the late Andrew, Susan, Alicia, Louise, Martin, Linzi and Katie.

References

1920 births
2000 deaths
English footballers
Association football central defenders
English Football League players
Bradford (Park Avenue) A.F.C. players
Barnsley F.C. players
Scarborough F.C. players
Huddersfield Town A.F.C. wartime guest players